Hasanat is the sixth album released by Ahmed Bukhatir in 2007. It consists of ten nasheeds of which four are in English. Two video clips were released after this album: Ya'Bonayya (O My Son) and Atfalana (Our Children).

Track listing

Video clips 
The video clip for Atfalana was released in 2008. It was shot in Salalah, Oman, during October 2008. The nasheed promotes brotherhood and unity with its cheerful words and Ahmed portrays a person who guides a group of children, encouraging them to be united. He follows them to prayers and guides the children against stealing and fighting. The video clip was directed by Ahmed Abdel Baset, who has worked with Ahmed Bukhatir three times in his career.

The video clip for Ya'Bonayya was released in 2007. Its director was Mohammed Al Ajami. The video clip portrayed Ahmed as a son who is happily living with his father but then decides to leave. After he leaves, they are both saddened by this separation.

Notes and references

External links
Official Website

Ahmed Bukhatir albums
2007 albums